Rock Island was the first revived Isle of Wight Festival to take place on the Seaclose Park site in Newport on the Isle of Wight. It was a one-day event held on 3 June 2002. The event had a capacity of 22,000, however only around 8 to 10,000 attended. Local band Neglected Youth won the right to open the concert in a recent talent contest, a tradition that would be continued throughout subsequent years of the festival. Limited camping facilities were also made available on fields nearby.

It is notable that this Festival took place on the same day as the Party at the Palace.

Line-up

Main Stage

Day tickets cost £35.

References

External links
 Isle of Wight Festival Official Website - isleofwightfestival.com

Music festivals on the Isle of Wight
2002 in British music
2002 in England
2002
21st century on the Isle of Wight